Babar Ali (born 18 March 1993) is a teacher from Murshidabad in West Bengal. He was called the "youngest headmaster in the world" by BBC in October 2009, at the age of sixteen.

He had begun teaching at nine years of age, mostly as a game, and then decided to continue teaching other children at a larger scale.

That the school is tuition-free makes it affordable for the poor in this economically deprived area, so that the school has been recognised to have helped increase literacy rates in the area. In Murshidabad there had been no governmental or private schools. Pupils come from nearby villages and walk up to four kilometres in order to attend their lessons.

Babar Ali succeeded in having his school recognized by the local authorities when he realised that this would entitle its pupils to the portion of free rice given to pupils at the end of the month by the government. Babar gets his inspiration from Swami Vivekananda.

In 2009, Babar Ali won a prize from the program Real Heroes of the Indian
English news channel CNN IBN for his work and was awarded the NDTV
‘Indian of the Year’ award and LITERACY HERO AWARD, BY ROTARY INDIA
LITERACY MISSION and recently featured in ‘FORBES ASIA’ in their 30 under 30 list as a ‘SOCIAL ENTREPRENEUR’, also recognised as the Literacy hero by international literacy association in their "30 under 30" list, Also received Education leadership award by BBC knowledge, His story became a part of the syllabus for the CBSE 10th standard English textbook, PUC English textbook for Govt. of Karnataka, and
also in curriculum across the globe. He was featured on Aamir Khan's
TV show Satyamev Jayate in July 2012, and is regularly invited to speak at
various conferences and forums all over the world.
Babar is also a TED Fellow and an  INK FELLOW AND INK Conference speaker and Wired fellow, Babar graduated
from Berhampur Krishnath College (under Kalyani University in West Bengal,
India) in English Honours, and Completed his M.A. in English & History.

The Karnataka government has included Babar's story in the prescribed English text book for first year PUC. His story is also in the main course book for 10th grade by NCERT in the CBSE board. Honourable President of India Shri Ramnath Kovind mentioned about him and his work in his speech towards nation on 25 January 2020.

References

External links
   Official Link

Indian schoolteachers
Living people
1993 births
Krishnath College alumni
Educators from West Bengal